Brígido Iriarte (1 June 1921 – 4 January 1984) was a Venezuelan track and field athlete who competed in the 1952 Summer Olympics. He competed in a wide variety of events, including the decathlon, men's athletics pentathlon, pole vault, long jump and javelin throw. He finished fourth in the 1955 Pan American Games decathlon, fifth in the javelin throw, and sixth in the pole vault. In the 1959 Pan American Games he finished sixth in the javelin throw and eighth in the pole vault.

References

1921 births
1984 deaths
Venezuelan male pole vaulters
Venezuelan male long jumpers
Venezuelan male javelin throwers
Venezuelan pentathletes
Venezuelan decathletes
Olympic athletes of Venezuela
Athletes (track and field) at the 1952 Summer Olympics
Athletes (track and field) at the 1955 Pan American Games
Athletes (track and field) at the 1959 Pan American Games
Pan American Games competitors for Venezuela
Central American and Caribbean Games gold medalists for Venezuela
Competitors at the 1954 Central American and Caribbean Games
Central American and Caribbean Games medalists in athletics
20th-century Venezuelan people